Haldis Havrøy (28 July 1925 – 10 September 2000) was a Norwegian politician for the Labour Party.

Havrøy was born in Hadsel.  She was elected to the Norwegian Parliament from Oslo in 1973, and was re-elected on two occasions.

References

1925 births
2000 deaths
Members of the Storting
Politicians from Oslo
Labour Party (Norway) politicians
20th-century Norwegian politicians
People from Hadsel